Adventures of a Brown Man in Search of Civilization is a 54-minute color documentary based on the life and thoughts of Nirad C. Chaudhuri. It was made in 1972 and was directed by James Ivory. In this, Chaudhuri (who was then based in London and Oxford) expounds his views on culture, history, religion and society from a comparative perspective.

The film is available in the DVD sets of several Merchant Ivory films.

References

External links

1972 films
1970s English-language films
British documentary films
Films directed by James Ivory
Documentary films about religion
Documentary films about writers
1972 documentary films
1970s British films